Triandos Luke (born December 24, 1981) is a former American football wide receiver He played in the 2004 season for the Denver Broncos in the National Football League.  He played collegiate football for the University of Alabama Crimson Tide.

College years
Luke attended the University of Alabama and was a Marketing Major and a standout in football.
In football, he was a two-year starter and finished his college career with 90 receptions for 1,072 yards(11.91 yards per reception avg.) and nine touchdowns, and 13 kickoff returns for 256 yards(19.69 yards per kickoff return avg.).

House Hunters
Appeared on House Hunters Episode HNT-7201H, "Former Beauty Queen Wants Fancy Digs in Philly".  Air date February 13, 2013.

External links
nfl.com profile
 https://web.archive.org/web/20130908205559/http://www.hgtv.com/house-hunters/former-beauty-queen-wants-fancy-digs-in-philly/index.html

1981 births
Living people
People from Phenix City, Alabama
American football wide receivers
Alabama Crimson Tide football players
Denver Broncos players